Manuel Riemann (born 9 September 1988) is a German professional footballer who plays as a goalkeeper for Bundesliga club VfL Bochum. He is the brother of fellow footballer Alexander Riemann.

Career statistics

References

External links

1988 births
Living people
Association football goalkeepers
German footballers
SV Wacker Burghausen players
VfL Osnabrück II players
VfL Osnabrück players
SV Sandhausen players
VfL Bochum players
Bundesliga players
2. Bundesliga players
3. Liga players
Regionalliga players
People from Mühldorf
Sportspeople from Upper Bavaria
Footballers from Bavaria